The men's triple jump event  at the 2001 IAAF World Indoor Championships was held on March 9.

Results

References
Results

Triple
Triple jump at the World Athletics Indoor Championships